NTTR may refer to:

 Nevada Test and Training Range, a USAF military region that began as the Tonopah Bombing Range
 Nevada Test and Training Range (military unit), the former USAF wing which is responsible for the Nevada range
 Raiatea Airport, in French Polynesia